Sacidava (Sacidaba, Acidava) was a Dacian town located between Cedonia and Apulon.

See also 
 Dacian davae
 List of ancient cities in Thrace and Dacia
 Dacia
 Roman Dacia

References

Ancient

Modern 

 

Dacian towns